The discography of Serbian pop singer Jelena Karleuša includes eleven studio albums, three live albums, three compilations, eleven singles and seventeen music videos.

Albums

Studio albums

Live albums

Compilation albums

Singles

Music videos

References

External links
 
 

Discographies of Serbian artists
Pop music discographies